Joanna Mehlhop Shepherd-Bailey is an American legal scholar and economist.

Shepherd earned a Bachelor of Business Administration at Baylor University in 1997, and completed a juris doctor degree in law and a PhD in economics at Emory University in 2002. She began teaching at Clemson University, returning to Emory as a faculty member in 2005. A 2016 analysis by Gregory Sisk considered Shepherd a highly cited legal scholar. In December 2019, Shepherd was named the Thomas Simmons Professor of Law.

References

American women legal scholars
Living people
Emory University faculty
Baylor University alumni
Emory University alumni
Clemson University faculty
Year of birth missing (living people)